A list of windmills in Buckinghamshire, UK.


Locations

Mock mill

Sources
Unless stated otherwise, the source for all entries is

Maps
1788 Thomas Jeffrey
1834 Ordnance Survey

Notes
Mills in bold are still standing, known building dates are indicated in bold. Text in italics denotes indicates that the information is not confirmed, but is likely to be the case stated.

References

 
Buckinghamshire
Windmills